Seit-Kaitetu, or Hila-Kaitetu, is an Austronesian language of Ambon Island in the Malukus. The dialects of the two villages, Seith and Kaitetu, are divergent.

References

Central Maluku languages
Languages of the Maluku Islands